Busisiwe Ndimeni (born 25 June 1991) is a South African footballer who plays as a forward for TUT-PTA and the South Africa women's national team.

References

1991 births
Living people
South African women's soccer players
South Africa women's international soccer players
Women's association football forwards
Russian Women's Football Championship players
Zvezda 2005 Perm players
South African expatriate soccer players
South African expatriate sportspeople in Russia
Expatriate women's footballers in Russia
2019 FIFA Women's World Cup players